Sonic Youth is the debut EP by American rock band Sonic Youth. It was recorded between December 1981 and January 1982 and released in March 1982 by Glenn Branca's Neutral label. It is the only recording featuring the early Sonic Youth lineup with Richard Edson on drums. Sonic Youth differs stylistically from the band's later work in its greater incorporation of clean guitars, standard tuning, crisp production and a post-punk style.

Background 
Sonic Youth is the only Sonic Youth release in which the guitars predominantly use standard tuning. James Jackson Toth of Stereogum stated that the album "sounds like the dark, post-punk cousin of Thurston's spunky new wave band the Coachmen." Drum-wise, the songs feature the more "downtown" roto-tom-addled stylings of Richard Edson, approaching the quasi-funk/hip-hop rhythms of 99 Records bands like ESG and Liquid Liquid. The bass guitar, though often playing minor key riffs, is almost funk-based, which was a common feature of post-punk and no wave music. The clean guitar tones contain little of the trademark noise that Sonic Youth would eventually become known for.

Although the original record clocks in at under 25 minutes in length, Sonic Youth is considered by the band to be their first studio album. Kim Gordon  has referred to it in her autobiography as an EP.

Release 
Sonic Youth was released on 12" vinyl in March 1982 on then-mentor Branca's record label Neutral. It was released in Europe on the German Zensor label in 1984.

Critical reception 

Sonic Youth has received a mixed reception from critics.

In his review of the 2006 reissue, Brandon Stosuy of Pitchfork gave the EP a grade of 8.2 out of 10, calling it "obviously more primitive than the quartet's later work [...] the recordings offer a ghostly, mesmerizing locked groove" and that "this is SY at their most icy; it's an erudite, windswept set, wrapping distortion inside danceable half-frozen Liquid Liquid beats." Andy Kellman of AllMusic wrote, "Awkward and rather formative, the record sounds like a fusion of no wave and an early Factory band." Trouser Press wrote of the album: "This disc is no fun."

Influence 
"She Is Not Alone" was covered by Slovenian band Borghesia, issued as a 1989 single by the Play It Again Sam label.

Reissues 
In 1987, SST reissued the album in its original vinyl format, as well as on cassette with all five tracks running on its first side. The flip side of the cassette featured the same five tracks on the other side, but played backwards from last to first, and the printing on both the J-card and cassette matched this: side 1 had the band name and song titles printed forwards, side 2 had them printed as a mirror image. That same year, the EP saw its first CD release by SST in the U.S. and by Blast First in the UK.

Sonic Youth was reissued by Geffen Records in 2006 on CD and as a double LP, with a number of bonus tracks that brought the running time to 63:04. Added were seven songs from a live performance recorded on 18 September 1981. Most of the tracks played were based on pieces composed by the band for the Noisefest festival held earlier in 1981, while others predate the band itself, such as Gordon's song "Cosmopolitan Girl". Several of these pieces are quite different from their studio counterparts, in particular the noisy early version of "She Is Not Alone". Among the tracks is the instrumental "Destroyer", previously coveted by bootleg collectors. Also added was a studio recording of a song that also appeared in a live version, "Where the Red Fern Grows". The song, an early version of "I Dreamed I Dream", was recorded in October 1981 at a studio in Chelsea during the band's first recording session. The session did not go well due at least partially to an engineer who did not understand the band's music. The studio version was an instrumental, while on the live take, Lee sang two lines towards the end. The 2006 booklet contains new photos and extensive liner notes from Branca, Edson and Byron Coley, as well as a "few notes" concerning the album from Thurston Moore. On the CD reissue, the tray card is double-sided – the side that faces out contains the track listing with a bar code and an RIAA anti-piracy notice, and the opposite side has the same track listing without a bar code or an RIAA warning. Despite the CD reissue on Geffen, logos for Neutral Records can still be found in numerous places in the package.

Track listing 

 The bonus tracks were recorded live at the Music for Millions Festival at the New Pilgrim Theatre in New York on September 18, 1981 except for the studio version of "Where the Red Fern Grows" which was "recorded Noise NY sessions, engineer unknown, October 1981" according to the liner notes.

Personnel 
 Sonic Youth

 Thurston Moore – guitar, vocals, bass guitar ("The Good and the Bad"), production
 Kim Gordon – bass guitar, vocals, guitar ("The Good and the Bad"), production
 Lee Ranaldo – guitar, vocals, power drill ("The Burning Spear"), production
 Richard Edson – drums, production

 Technical

 Don Hunerberg – engineering

References

External links 

 

Sonic Youth EPs
1982 debut EPs
SST Records EPs
Post-punk EPs
No wave EPs